Arenaria radians is a species of plant in the family Caryophyllaceae. It is endemic to Ecuador.  Its natural habitat is subtropical or tropical high-altitude grassland. It is threatened by habitat loss.

References

Flora of Ecuador
radians
Critically endangered plants
Taxonomy articles created by Polbot